Jill Curzon is an English actress best known for her film and television appearances during the 1960s.

Her television appearances include The Champions (1969), Adam Adamant Lives! (1967), The Saint (1965), Hugh and I and Disneyland (1963). Her film roles include a nurse in 80,000 Suspects (1963), Katharine Banks in Dr. Syn, Alias the Scarecrow (1963), Louise, the niece of Dr. Who (Peter Cushing) in Daleks' Invasion Earth 2150 A.D. (1966), and June in Smokescreen (1964).

Curzon was interviewed about her appearance as Louise in Daleks' Invasion Earth 2150 A.D. in the documentary Dalekmania (1995).

Partial filmography
80,000 Suspects (1963) - Nurse Jill
Dr. Syn, Alias the Scarecrow (1963) - Katharine Banks
Smokescreen (1964) - June
The Intelligence Men (1965) - French Girl (uncredited)
Daleks' Invasion Earth 2150 A.D. (1966) - Louise

References

External links

Jill Curzon at Channel 4's Film Four website

20th-century English actresses
English film actresses
English television actresses
Living people
Place of birth missing (living people)
Year of birth missing (living people)